Soundsystem_01 is Hybrid's first mix album with Hope Recordings. It was released on 14 July 2008 through Hope Recordings in the UK and then in the United States on 5 August 2008 through Nettwerk. The album also contains remixes of music from artists like Trentemøller, Massive Attack and Andy Page as well as music by movie composers Harry Gregson-Williams and John Murphy.

Track listing

Trivia
 "Desert Chase" is originally from the Seraphim Falls soundtrack.
 "Sweet Is Good" is originally from the Danny The Dog soundtrack. The track is absent in the American version.
 "Going Home" is originally from the 28 Weeks Later soundtrack.
 "Soldier's requiem" is originally from the 28 Days Later soundtrack.
 "Saladin" is originally from the Kingdom of Heaven soundtrack.
 "World Citizen – I Won't Be Disappointed / Looped Piano Music" is originally from the Babel soundtrack, but has been re-edited for this album by Hybrid.
 In the liner notes in the booklet, "Gamma" is misspelt "Gama."
 Some of the tracks' full names are listed in the booklet.
 "6AM Sedna" uses samples from the track "Shortcut To Granuland" from the Lostep album "Because We Can", along with an extra vocal sample.

References 

Hybrid (British band) albums
2008 remix albums
Nettwerk Records remix albums
Articles with underscores in the title